Pseustes sulphureus, commonly known as the yellow-bellied puffing snake, is a species of snake in the family Colubridae. The species is endemic to South America.

Description
Its venom is bimodal and can directly affect both mammal and reptile prey.

Geographic range
P. sulphureus is found in northern South America and Trinidad and Tobago.

Diet
Adults of P. sulphureus feed on small mammals, birds and other snakes (both venomous and
non-venomous), while juveniles feed on lizards, mice and rats.

Subspecies
Two subspecies are recognized as being valid, including the nominotypical subspecies.
Pseustes sulphureus dieperinkii 
Pseustes sulphureus sulphureus 

Nota bene: A trinomial authority in parentheses indicates that the subspecies was original described in a genus other than Pseustes.

References

Further reading
Boulenger GA (1894). Catalogue of the Snakes in the British Museum (Natural History). Volume II., Containing the Conclusion of the Colubridæ Aglyphæ. London: Trustees of the British Museum (Natural History). (Taylor and Francis, printers). xi + 382 pp. + Plates I-XX. (Phrynonax sulphureus, p. 19).
Freiberg M (1982). Snakes of South America. Hong Kong: T.F.H. Publications. 189 pp. . (Pseustes sulphureus, p. 108 + color photo, p. 151).
Jadin, Robert C.; Burbrink, Frank T,; Rivas, Gilson A.; Vitt, Laurie J; Barrio-Amorós, César L.; Guralnick, Robert P. (2013). "Finding arboreal snakes in an evolutionary tree: phylogenetic placement and systematic revision of the Neotropical birdsnakes". Journal of Zoological Systematics and Evolutionary Research 52 (3); 257-264. (Spilotes sulphureus, new combination).
Wagler J (1824). In Spix J (1824). Serpentum Brasiliensum species novae ou histoire naturelle des espèces nouvelles de serpens, recueillies et observées pendant le voyage dans l'intérieur du Brésil dans les années 1817, 1818, 1819, 1820, exécuté par ordre de sa Majesté le Roi de Baviére. Munich: F.S. Hübschmann. viii + 75 pp. + Plates I-XXVI. (Natrix sulphurea, new species, pp. 26–27 + Plate IX). (in Latin and French).

Colubrids
Reptiles of Trinidad and Tobago
Reptiles of Guyana
Snakes of South America
Reptiles described in 1824